Plesitomoxia is a genus of beetles in the family Mordellidae, containing the following species:

 Plesitomoxia atra Ermisch, 1962
 Plesitomoxia congoana Ermisch, 1967
 Plesitomoxia sericea Franciscolo, 1965
 Plesitomoxia sudanensis Ermisch, 1968

References

Mordellidae